Sabil may refer to:

Places
Sabil, Iran
Sabil, Saudi Arabia

Public fountains
Sebil (fountain) or sabil, a public water fountain in Islamic countries
Sabil-Kuttab of Abd al-Rahman Katkhuda, Cairo
Sabil-Kuttab of Qaytbay, Cairo
Sabil Abu Nabbut, roadside fountain in Jaffa, Israel
Sebilj in Sarajevo, public fountain